TMC (originally short for Télé Monte-Carlo) is a Franco–Monégasque general entertainment television channel, owned by the French media holding company Groupe TF1.

History
The oldest private channel in Europe, TMC dates back to 1954, inaugurated by Rainier III, Prince of Monaco. Like several other European television channels, its first major broadcast was one relating to the country's reigning dynasty, in this case the marriage of Prince Rainier III and Grace Kelly. As a result of an agreement between Prince Rainier III and the French President François Mitterrand, TMC was able to be broadcast as far west as Montpellier, France, tripling its coverage (three million potential viewers).

In 1987, the channel was carried for a few hours on M6, a French television service — which made it available to much more of France — and the channel was eventually carried by CanalSat and became available in all of France and the Indian Ocean area. The channel also won a spot on the French language digital terrestrial television scheme, demonstrating its wide appeal.

The channel was owned jointly by the TF1 Group (40%), the AB Groupe (40%) and the Government of Monaco (20%). In 2010, TF1 Group bought AB Group's shares, In 2016, TF1 bought the Government of Monaco's shares, and now owns 100% of the channel.

Until 1995, TMC was a member of the European Broadcasting Union as a part of Radio Monte-Carlo (RMC). Currently the Monégasque membership is held by Groupement de Radiodiffuseurs Monégasques (GRMC), a joint organisation by Monte-Carlo Radiodiffusion (RMC) and Radio Monte Carlo (RMC).

Since October 2022, TMC, as well as the free DTT channels of the TF1 group, have been accessible free to air, via the Astra 1 satellite. This broadcast follows a temporary interruption in encrypted broadcasting to Canal+ and TNTSAT subscribers. , following a commercial dispute. However, despite the resumption of encrypted broadcasts within the Canal+ and TNTSAT bouquets, this free-to-air broadcasting continues. TMC is therefore received free of charge in almost all of Continental Europe and North African Countries.

Logos

Programming
TMC shows a variety of programmes, including many imports. It also produces much original programming that include news magazines, cooking shows, and talkshows, which include:

SUD: A cultural programme focusing on Monaco and the South of France, aired every Sunday.
Monacoscope: A weekly summary programme presenting the latest news of politics, sports and the monarchy of Monaco, aired every Saturday.
TMC Info: A programme presenting the latest news of politics, sports and the monarchy of Monaco, airs daily.
Notre région: A news magazine focussing on political, cultural and economic news of the French region of Provence-Alpes-Côte d'Azur

TV Shows

Downton Abbey
Saving Grace
Les filles d'à côté
Undercover Boss
MacGyver
The A-Team
Law & Order
Alarm für Cobra 11 - Die Autobahnpolizei
Army Wives
Extreme Makeover: Home Edition
Eleventh Hour
Agatha Christie's Poirot
The Case-Book of Sherlock Holmes
The Return of Sherlock Holmes
Agatha Christie's Marple
The Memoirs of Sherlock Holmes
Une femme d'honneur
Life
Psych
Monk Sherlock Yack: Zoo Decetive''

Sports programing

Association football 

 FIFA
FIFA World Cup qualification until 2022 (selected UEFA team (exclude France team) matches (shared with TFX, W9, and L'Équipe), France matches live on TF1 (including finals tournament) and M6)
 FIFA Women's World Cup (selected matches at the finals tournament only, co-licensed with Canal+)
 UEFA until 2022 (except for Men's Nations League and Women's Champions League until 2021)
 Men's
UEFA European Championship (selected qualifiers not involving France team only (shared with TFX, W9, and L'Équipe), selected qualifiers and finals (including France team matches) live on TF1 and M6)
 UEFA Nations League (selected matches (including Finals and excluding France team) (shared with L'Équipe (group stage only), TFX, and W9), France matches live on TF1 and M6)
 Friendly matches (selected matches (including one France team in June 2019) (shared with TFX, W9 and L'Équipe), France matches live on TF1 and M6)
 Women's
UEFA European Championship (selected matches at the finals tournament only, co-licensed with Canal+)
UEFA Champions League (final only, licensed from Canal+)

Motorsport 

 Formula 1 (Monaco GP only, French GP and other two races live on TF1, licensed from Canal+)

Rugby 

 Rugby World Cup (shared with TF1 in 2019)

Handball 

 IHF Men's and Women's World Championships (France matches at the finals tournament that not aired by TF1 only (if qualified) until 2025, licensed from beIN Sports)
 EHF Men's and Women's European Championships (France matches at the finals tournament that not aired by TF1 only (if qualified) until 2024, licensed from beIN Sports)

Tennis 

 Davis Cup (France matches only from 2019 Finals, licensed from beIN Sports)

References

External links
www.tmc.tv – official website 

Television in Monaco
Television stations in France
French-language television stations
Television channels and stations established in 1954
European Broadcasting Union members
1954 establishments in Monaco